John Williams (January 7, 1807 in Utica, Oneida County, New York – March 26, 1875) was an American merchant and politician from New York.

Life
Williams was a partner of miller Warham Whitney (1786-1840), whose mill was at the second falls on the Genesee River. Williams married successively two of his partner's daughters, first Caroline (1812-1836) in 1832 and then Olive (1814-1867) in 1840.

He served as paymaster to New York's First Regiment of Riflemen starting in 1827. In 1838 he organized the Company of Western New York, known as "Williams' Light Infantry"; they were accepted as a State Battalion of Artillery in 1839 and Williams was commissioned as a major. The battalion was disbanded in 1849.  In 1862 Williams was commissioned as brigadier general of the 25th Brigade, and was promoted in 1869 to major general of the 7th division.

He was Mayor of Rochester, New York, in 1853. He was elected as a Democrat to the 34th United States Congress, serving from March 4, 1855, to March 3, 1857. He also served several terms as treasurer of the city of Rochester and on the school board; John Williams School #5 in Rochester, now a kindergarten through eighth grade school, is named in his honor.

He was known to have corresponded with Susan B. Anthony.

External links

References

Mayors of Rochester, New York
Politicians from Utica, New York
1807 births
1875 deaths
Democratic Party members of the United States House of Representatives from New York (state)
19th-century American politicians
Businesspeople from Utica, New York
19th-century American businesspeople